George A. Bowman was a member of the Wisconsin State Assembly.

Biography
Bowman was born on May 29, 1890, in Shelbyville, Illinois. He attended Marquette University and Marquette University Law School. Bowman served as Milwaukee County district attorney and as register of deeds. In 1919, Bowman served in the Wisconsin State Assembly and was a Republican; in 1934, Bowman switched to the Wisconsin Progressive Party.  Bowman died in Houston, Texas, on May 7, 1957, after undergoing emergency surgery.

References

People from Shelbyville, Illinois
Republican Party members of the Wisconsin State Assembly
Wisconsin Progressives (1924)
Wisconsin lawyers
Marquette University alumni
Marquette University Law School alumni
1890 births
1957 deaths
20th-century American politicians
20th-century American lawyers